Established in August 2007, Tahquitz High School (Tah-quitz) is a high school of approximately 1700 students on the northwestern side of Hemet, California operated by the Hemet Unified School District. The high school's mascot is a 'titan warrior'  school colors are green and gold.

Kari McGowan is the school principal.

The high school served as an evacuation center during the Fairview Fire of September 2022.

Demographics
The demographic breakdown of the 1,582 students enrolled for the 2014–2015 school year was:
Male - 54.2%
Female - 45.8%
Native American/Alaskan - 0.4%
Asian/Pacific islanders - 3.5%
Black - 11.3%
Hispanic - 60.5%
White - 20.9%
Multiracial - 3.3%

In addition, 80.5% of the students were eligible for free or reduced-priced lunch, making this a Title I school.

Sports and Athletics
m=Male   f=Female

Soccer-m/f                                             
Football-m
Basketball-m/f
Baseball-m
Golf-m/f
Tennis-m/f
Track & field-m/f
Water polo-m/f
Wrestling-m/f
Volleyball-m/f
Softball-f

See also
Tahquitz (spirit)

References

External links
 
 Hemet Unified School District

High schools in Riverside County, California
Hemet, California
Public high schools in California
2007 establishments in California